Statistics of Bahraini Premier League in the 1981–82 season.

Overview
Bahrain Riffa Club won the championship.

References
RSSSF

Bahraini Premier League seasons
Bah
football